Sinch'ŏn County is a county in South Hwanghae Province, North Korea.

Geography
Sinch'ŏn is bordered to the north by Anak, to the west by Samch'ŏn and T'aet'an, to the south by Pyŏksŏng and Sinwŏn, and to the east by Chaeryŏng. Most of the land in Sinch'ŏn is composed of flat plains, with mountains forming its borders. The highest point is Mt. Ch'ŏnbong, at 627 meters.

There are several famous hot springs in Sinch'ŏn, including the Sinch'ŏn and Kŭlloja Springs. The county is also home to the famous Chahyesa Buddhist temple, founded in 1572.

History
The Koryo dynasty named the area occupied by Sinch'ŏn as Sinju. It received its current name under the Yi dynasty in 1413. In 1909 Sinch'ŏn was annexed to Munhwa, now no longer extant. The county's current form was settled in the 1952 redistricting changes, in which its eastern part was annexed to newly formed Samch'ŏn county.

At the beginning of the Korean War in 1950, the town of Sinch'ŏn was allegedly the site of a massacre of civilians by occupying U.S. forces (see Sinchon Massacre). North Korean sources claim the number of civilians killed over the 52-day period at more than 35,000 people, equivalent to one-fourth of the population then of Sinchon county. The North Korean government has operated the Sinchon Museum of American War Atrocities in Sinch'ŏn Town since 1958, displaying relics and remains from the incident. South Korean historians dispute this account, saying the deaths were at the hands of right-wing security forces. No evidence has been found to support North Korean allegations that an American general directed the massacre.

Transportation
The county is served by the Ŭllyul Line of the Korean State Railway, with stations at Paeksŏk, Sinch'ŏn Onch'ŏn, Sinch'ŏn, and Hwanghae Ryongmun stations. There is also a highway which runs through Sinch'ŏn-ŭp.

Divisions
The county is divided into one town (ŭp) and 31 villages (ri).

Twin cities
Sinchon is twinned with Kragujevac, Serbia since 1976.

See also
Administrative divisions of North Korea
Geography of North Korea
No Gun Ri massacre
Sinchon Massacre

References

Counties of South Hwanghae